Yaru may refer to:

 Yaru, Iran, a village in Hormozgan Province, Iran
 Yaru, Pakistan, a town in Pakistan
 Yaru, Indonesia, an island in the Tanimbar Islands group
 the Yale Arbovirus Research Unit, a research laboratory at Yale University